Magna Carta was built in the Netherlands in 1936. She was converted from a sand carrying cargo vessel to a hotel barge in 2001-2002 after 65 years carrying cargo for the same family. The barge conversion was designed and managed by Dominic Read, one of the new owners.

Magna Carta has 4 double cabins allowing her to carry up to 8 passengers. She also has separate crew quarters which house the crew of four.  The crew consists of the captain, two hostesses, chef, and tour guide.

References

External links
 Magna Carta Official site

Hotel barges
Barges
1936 ships